Miss Ukraine Universe 2018, the 23rd edition of the Miss Ukraine Universe pageant was held in Fairmont Grand Hotel in Kyiv. Yana Krasnikova of Kyiv crowned her successor Karyna Zhosan of Odessa at the end of the event. 18 contestants competed for the crown.

The winner represented Ukraine at Miss Universe 2018 pageant in Bangkok, Thailand.

Results

Placement

Contestants
The official Top 18 finalists of The Next Miss Ukraine Universe 2018.

References

External links

2018
2018 beauty pageants
August 2018 events in Ukraine
2018 in Ukraine